Levels is an unincorporated community in Hampshire County in the U.S. state of West Virginia. According to the 2000 census, the Levels community has a population of 147. It is home to John J. Cornwell Elementary School.

The community was so named on account of the relatively level original town site. Levels was originally known as Levels Cross Roads because of its location at the intersection of four roads in north-central Hampshire County: Bright's Hollow Road (County Route 5/5) north to Okonoko, Little Cacapon-Levels Road (County Route 3/3) southeast to Slanesville, Jersey Mountain Road (County Route 5) south to Romney, and Frenches Station Road (County Route 5/7) northwest to South Branch Depot.

Notable residents  
Howard Llewellyn Swisher (1870–1945), American businessperson, real estate developer, and historian

Churches 
Church of the Brethren
Capon Chapel Church of the Brethren, Little Cacapon-Levels Road (CR 3/3)
Oak Grove Church of the Brethren, Jersey Mountain Road (CR 5)
Methodist
Levels United Methodist Church, Jersey Mountain Road (CR 5)

References

Bibliography

External links

 

Unincorporated communities in Hampshire County, West Virginia
Unincorporated communities in West Virginia